Prochora praticola is a species of spider in the family Miturgidae. It is found in China, Korea, and Japan, and was first described by Friedrich Wilhelm Bösenberg and Embrik Strand in 1906 as Agroeca praticola.

References

Miturgidae
Spiders of Asia
Arthropods of Korea
Chelicerates of Japan
Spiders described in 1906